Angelica Domröse (born April 4, 1941, in Berlin) is a German actress, who became famous in the role of Paula in Heiner Carow's film The Legend of Paul and Paula. Her biological father was a prisoner of war from France.

Life
After training as a shorthand typist Domröse worked in a state-run foreign trade enterprise in East Germany. In 1958 she was discovered by the director Slatan Dudow and in 1961 attended the film university Potsdam-Babelsberg. In 1966 she joined the Berliner Ensemble, where among other things she performed in Brecht's Dreigroschenoper, Schwejk im zweiten Weltkrieg and Die Tage der Commune, as well as in Helmut Baierl's Frau Flinz. She later worked with the Volksbühne Berlin until 1979, with whom she performed in plays by George Bernard Shaw, William Shakespeare and Peter Hacks. She also worked for the DEFA film studio and Deutscher Fernsehfunk. In 1971, 1973 and 1975 she was nominated television actress of the year, and in 1976 she won the National Prize of East Germany.

In 1980 she left the GDR and moved to West Germany.

Career
In 1958, Domröse was discovered by director Slatan Dudow during a casting for the film Verwirrung der Liebe (Love's Confusion).

Filmography

Love's Confusion, 1959
Papas neue Freundin, 1960, TV film
Vielgeliebtes Sternchen, 1961, TV film
At A French Fireside (1963)
Chronik eines Mordes, 1964–65, DEFA film, based on work by Leonhard Frank
Die Abenteuer des Werner Holt, 1965, DEFA film, based on work by Dieter Noll
Entlassen auf Bewährung, 1965
Ein Lord vom Alexanderplatz, 1967
Wege übers Land, 1968, TV film
Já, spravedlnost, 1968, ČSSR film
Effi Briest, 1969–70, based on the novel by Theodor Fontane
Unterm Birnbaum, based on the novel by Theodor Fontane
Die Legende von Paul und Paula, 1972–73, directed by Heiner Carow
Die Brüder Lautensack, 1972–73, TV film based on the work by Lion Feuchtwanger
Mein lieber Mann und ich, 1975
Daniel Druskat, 1976, TV film
Abschied vom Frieden, 1977, TV film
Bis dass der Tod euch scheidet, 1978, directed by Heiner Carow
The Second Skin, 1981, TV film, directed by Frank Beyer
, 1981
Fleeting Acquaintances, 1982, TV film
, 1983
Fraulein, 1986, TV film, directed by Michael Haneke
The Mistake, 1992, directed by Heiner Carow
Polizeiruf 110 - , 1996, TV series episode, directed by Urs Odermatt.
Valley of the Innocent, 2003, directed by Branwen Okpako
, 2012

References 
Funke, C., Kranz, D., 1976: Angelica Domröse. Berlin
Domröse, Angelika, 2003: Ich fang mich selbst ein : mein Leben. Bergisch Gladbach: Lübbe.

External links

Short biography 
DEFA-Sternstunden: Angelica Domröse 

1941 births
Living people
Actresses from Berlin
East German actors
East German women
20th-century German actresses
Recipients of the National Prize of East Germany
Recipients of the Art Prize of the German Democratic Republic